In 2015, Kent County Cricket Club competed in Division Two of the County Championship, Group B of the 50-over Royal London One-Day Cup and the South Group of the NatWest t20 Blast. The team reached the quarter-finals of both one day competitions but struggled in the County Championship, finishing seventh in Division Two.

The season was the fourth in charge for head coach Jimmy Adams. The club captain was former England batsmen Rob Key, although Sam Northeast took over the on-field captaincy in May after Key, having dropped himself due to poor form, chose to relinquish the captaincy to concentrate on his batting. Northeast replaced Key as the club captain for the 2016 season.

Two players from the Kent squad made senior international appearances for England in 2015. James Tredwell was a part of the World Cup squad, but only featured in the final group stage match against Afghanistan after both sides had already been eliminated from the tournament. He then played in the first Test against the West Indies in Antigua (only his second Test, having made his debut in 2010). Tredwell took 5 wickets in the match but did not play in the remainder of the series, and with England turning to several younger players after the disappointing World Cup, he was not selected during the English summer. One of the new faces in the England team over the summer was Kent keeper Sam Billings who played as a specialist batsmen in all 5 ODI matches against Australia and the single T20I matches against both Australia and New Zealand.

Matt Coles won the club's Player of the Year award, taking 100 wickets across all formats in the first season of his second spell at the county.

Squad
The start of the season saw the return of top-order batsman Joe Denly and fast bowler Matt Coles after spells at Middlesex and Hampshire, respectively. The squad did not include an overseas player.

South African born batsman Sean Dickson, who holds a UK passport, signed for the county midway through the season after an impressive trial in the Second XI. Having not made an appearance for the first XI since May, former West Indies international Brendan Nash agreed to end his three-and-a-half year spell at Kent by mutual consent.

Squad list
 Ages given as of the first day of the County Championship season, 12 April 2015.

County Championship
Kent endured another difficult season in Division Two of the County Championship. Poor batting performances ultimately resulted in a seventh-place finish, although the team finished the season strongly and ended with 4 victories. The team regularly featured a number of young players and the bowling was impressive. Matt Coles took 67 championship wickets in 14 matches on his return to the county (and 100 wickets across all formats), while veteran all-rounder Darren Stevens again made a significant contribution with the ball. In addition, young seam bowlers including Calum Haggett and Ivan Thomas impressed throughout the season and were rewarded with contract extensions while Matt Hunn broke into the side after taking his first five wicket haul against the touring Australian side in June.

Division Two

Matches

Other first-class match
Kent hosted a first-class match at the St Lawrence Ground against Australia, providing the tourists first opposition of the 2015 Ashes tour. Australia won the game by 225 runs, although Kent opening batsman Daniel Bell-Drummond scored a century in the side's second innings and seamer Matt Hunn took his first five wickets haul.

Royal London One-Day Cup
In the 2015 Royal London One-Day Cup, Kent edged through the group stage in fourth place after a thrilling run chase against Nottinghamshire at Trent Bridge in the penultimate round of group games saw a target of 336 achieved with 8 balls to spare. The match featured a century from Sam Billings and a hat-trick for bowler Matt Coles. The final round of games in the group were all washed out by rain and the county progressed into the quarter-finals on net run rate.

Kent lost the quarter-final against Surrey in a rain affected match at The Oval. After bowling Surrey out for 273, a target of 251 from 40 overs was set using the Duckworth-Lewis Method following a heavy rain storm at the start of the Kent innings. Despite a counter-attacking century from Matt Coles, Kent were bowled out for 233.

Group B

Matches

Quarter-finals

NatWest t20 Blast
After a series of good performances, Kent's young side topped the South Group of the 2015 NatWest t20 Blast but went out of the competition at the quarter-final stage to Lancashire. After being bowled out for 142, late wickets led to a "dramatic" finish with Lancashire scoring two runs off the last ball of the match to tie the game with a score of 142/6. Lancashire progressed to the finals day due to losing fewer wickets.

South Group

Matches

Quarter-finals

MCCU match
Kent played a three-day match, without first-class status, against Loughborough MCC University before the start of the County Championship season.

Statistics
Sam Northeast and Joe Denly both made over a thousand runs in first-class cricket in 2015 with Denly making the highest score for the county. Daniel Bell-Drummond scored three first-class centuries during the season and led the team in List A runs. Northeast scored a county record high score of 114 runs in the Twenty20 competition.

Matt Coles led the bowling statistics with 100 wickets across all competitions during the season, including 67 in first-class matches. Coles took a hat-trick in the Royal London One Day Cup quarter final loss to Surrey. Mitchell Claydon led the Twenty20 bowling statistics.

Batting

Bowling

References

External links
Kent home at ESPN cricinfo
Kent County Cricket Club official site

2015
2015 in English cricket